Love, Simon (Original Motion Picture Soundtrack) is the soundtrack album to the 2018 film of the same name. The soundtrack of the film includes music by Bleachers, Troye Sivan, Amy Shark, Brenton Wood, The 1975, Normani and Khalid, among others. The first track released from the soundtrack was "Alfie's Song (Not So Typical Love Song)", followed by "Love Lies" and "Strawberries & Cigarettes". The album was released by RCA Records and Sony Music Entertainment, on March 16, 2018, coinciding with the film's theatrical release. A separate score album, Love, Simon (Original Motion Picture Score), composed by Rob Simonsen was distributed and released by Lakeshore Records on the same day.

Love, Simon (Original Motion Picture Soundtrack)

Track listing

Additional music 
Other songs that appear in the film but are not included on its soundtrack include "Waterloo Sunset" by The Kinks, "Diamond" by MONAKR, "Nobody Speak" by DJ Shadow & Run the Jewels, "Feel It Still" by Portugal. The Man, "No" by Meghan Trainor, "Out the Speakers" by A-Trak, Milo and Otis feat. Rich Kidz, "As Long as You Love Me" by Justin Bieber, "Add It Up" by Violent Femmes, "Monster Mash" by Bobby Pickett, "Bad Romance" by Lady Gaga (performed by the Michigan Marching Band), "Shine a Light" by BANNERS, and "Heaven" by Warrant.

Charts

Weekly charts

Year-end charts

Accolades

Love, Simon (Original Motion Picture Score)

Track listing

References 

2018 soundtrack albums
2018 compilation albums
RCA Records soundtracks
Lakeshore Records soundtracks
Sony Music soundtracks
Rob Simonsen soundtracks
Film scores
Albums produced by Jack Antonoff